Valentine Weaver House, also known as Weaver House, is a historic home located in Macungie, Lehigh County, Pennsylvania.  It was built in 1876, and is a three-story brick dwelling in the form of a Gothic Cottage. It has a central projecting pavilion on the front façade, a patterned slate roof, and a full-width front porch. Also on the property are a brick octagonal outhouse, brick smokehouse, spring house, and ice house.

It was added to the National Register of Historic Places in 1984.

References

External links
Valentine Weaver House at Roadtrippers.com

Houses on the National Register of Historic Places in Pennsylvania
Gothic Revival architecture in Pennsylvania
Houses completed in 1876
Houses in Lehigh County, Pennsylvania
National Register of Historic Places in Lehigh County, Pennsylvania